Trilepidea is a extinct monotypic genus of flowering plants belonging to the family Loranthaceae. Its native range was New Zealand. The only species was Trilepidea adamsii, or Adams mistletoe. It was first described in 1880 as Loranthus adamsii and has ever only been collected from a few locations in the North Island. It has been argued that the extinction of this species, vulnerable due to restricted distribution, was caused by interaction of a number of factors, including introduction of an exotic species, in this case the brushtail possum from Australia.

References

Loranthaceae
Monotypic Santalales genera
Loranthaceae genera
Taxa described in 1895
Taxa named by Philippe Édouard Léon Van Tieghem